Blockhouse on Signal Mountain is located along Mackenzie Hill Road within the West Range of the Fort Sill Military Reservation inceptively declared as Camp Wichita during May 1868 within the current administrative division of Comanche County, Oklahoma. The blockhouse was established in 1871 pursuant to the Medicine Lodge Treaty of 1867.

The four wall dwelling was erected as some of the first limestone architecture as part of Fort Sill's Old Post Corral or United States Army Quartermaster Corps fortification foraged during the American Indian Wars on the American frontier.

The observation post was settled as a signal station and weather observatory providing military communications between Signal Mountain, Medicine Bluffs, Mountain Scott, and Fort Reno geographically positioned north of the Canadian River within the Great Plains. The Fort Sill, Indian Territory signal station officially commenced atmospheric observations and telegraphic communications on June 23, 1875 with meteorological reports beginning on September 9, 1875.

The Army Signal Corps employed flag semaphore, heliograph, and signal lamp as optical communication along a visual topographical line of sight for distant information exchange. The semaphore communications served as an intelligence assessment of the Wichita Mountains cadastre while protecting the westward movement prairie trails as an integration of the Westward Expansion Trails.

The mountainous altitude served as an observation of the Plains Indians equine flights disrupting the manifest destiny of westbound wagon trains ostracizing the Reconstruction era at the crest of the progressive Gilded Age. The high ground outpost continually anticipated the spontaneous mobilization of the Old Post Redoubt troops into the rugged terrain of southwestern Indian Territory.

The geology of Oklahoma elevation features an area reconnaissance potentially revealing the disturbance of the prairie trails by equine herds reciprocative to the Oklahoma red beds and the shortgrass prairie of the Comanche, Kiowa, and Wichita Indian reservation within Southwestern Oklahoma.

Native Raids on Military Supply Wagon Trains
The stone lookout station was decisively undisputed at the Fort Sill outpost after Sheridan's campaign during the winter of 1868 to 1869 and the realization of cultural assimilation of Native Americans.

During the commencement of 1870s, the Southern Plains tribes organized native raids on Indian Territory forts and military supply trains exemplifying the prairie plains as treacherous grounds for American frontier expeditions. The Army on the Frontier chartered a defense line of forts throughout Indian Territory and Texas as a deterence for the safeguard of American pioneer, homesteading, and Territorial evolution of the United States.

Listing as National Register of Historic Places
Blockhouse on Signal Mountain was established as National Register of Historic Places with the National Park Service on November 29, 1978.

See also

Southern Frontier Forts of Indian Territory

Exploratory Prairie Routes of Indian Territory

Indian Peace Commission and Southern Plains Tribal Agency

Preservation of American Bison

References

Bibliography

Video Media Archive
☆ 
☆ 
☆ 
☆ 
☆ 
☆ 
☆ 

American Buffalo and Plains Indians Experience
☆ 
☆ 
☆ 
☆ 
☆

External links
 
 
 
 
 
 
 

1871 establishments in Indian Territory
Buildings and structures in Comanche County, Oklahoma
Military installations established in 1871
National Register of Historic Places in Comanche County, Oklahoma